Sanmin District is a district of Kaohsiung, Taiwan.

History
During the Ming dynasty, the Wang, Tsai, and Cheng families built houses in the area to farm the land. The area was thus named Sankuaicu. After the handover of Taiwan from Japan to the Republic of China, the area was renamed Sanmin to set a good example.

Geography
The current population of Sanmin District is 330,955 people, consisting of 158,889 males and 172,066 females.

Administrative divisions
As of August 2006, Sanmin District has 87 villages; which are divided into 1,749 neighborhoods; which are further sub-divided into 125,561 households. Villages in the district are Dingjin, Dingcheng, Dingjiang, Dingli, Dingxi, Dingzhong, Dingtai, Benguan, Benhe, Benwen, Benwu, Benyuan, Benan, Benshang, Benyang, Baoshi, Baode, Baotai, Baoxing, Baozhong, Baohua, Baoguo, Baomin, Baoqing, Baoye, Baocheng, Baoan, Baolong, Baozhu, Baoyu, Wanzi, Wanai, Wanzhong, Wanhua, Wansheng, Wanli, Wanfu, Zhengxing, Zhengshun, Wanxing, Wancheng, Ankang, Anning, Anji, Anfa, Antung, Dade, Daming, Daren, Dayong, Tongde, Dezhi, Deren, Ansheng, Detung, Dehang, Jinghua, Minxiang, Anyi, Antai, Anbang, Shiquan, Shimei, Debei, Licheng, Liye, Gangtung, Gangxin, Gangxi, Boai, Bohui, Zhangming, Jiantung, Xingde, Fengnan, Fengbei, Dexi, Fengyu, Chuantung, Yumin, Lihang, Qiansui, Lide, Qianbei and Qianqiu Village.

Education

Universities
 Kaohsiung Medical University
 National Kaohsiung University of Science and Technology
 Wenzao Ursuline University of Languages

High schools
 Kaohsiung Municipal Sanmin Senior High School
The Kaohsiung Japanese School was previously located in Sanmin District. The final day of class in the former Sanmin campus was on 19 July 2014 (103rd year of the Republic).

Tourist attractions
 Former Tangrong Brick Kiln
 Jinshi Lake
 Kaohsiung Hakka Cultural Museum
 Kaohsiung Vision Museum
 National Science and Technology Museum
 Sanfong Central Street
 Sankuaicuo Station
 Tower of Light
 Zhongdu Wetlands Park

Transportation
 Kaohsiung Main Station
 Minzu Station

References

External links

 

Districts of Kaohsiung